Ptychocorax is an extinct genus of mackerel sharks that lived during the Late Cretaceous. It contains three valid species that have been found in Europe and Asia. It was originally identified as a hybodontiform, but was later reidentified as an anacoracid. It has also been considered to belong to its own family, Ptychocoracidae. Ptychocorax is characterized by its unique dentition, combining Squalicorax-like, cutting anterior teeth with Ptychodus-like, crushing posterior teeth.

References

Prehistoric shark genera
Fish described in 1980
Anacoracidae